The Iowa class was a class of six fast battleships ordered by the United States Navy in 1939 and 1940. They were initially intended to intercept fast capital ships such as the Japanese  while also being capable of serving in a traditional battle line alongside slower battleships and act as its "fast wing". The Iowa class was designed to meet the Second London Naval Treaty's "escalator clause" limit of  standard displacement.

The four Iowa-class ships were the last battleships commissioned in the US Navy. All older US battleships were decommissioned by 1947 and stricken from the Naval Vessel Register (NVR) by 1963. Between the mid-1940s and the early 1990s, the Iowa-class battleships fought in four major US wars. In the Pacific Theater of World War II, they served primarily as fast escorts for s of the Fast Carrier Task Force and also shelled Japanese positions. During the Korean War, the battleships provided naval gunfire support (NGFS) for United Nations forces, and in 1968, New Jersey shelled Viet Cong and Vietnam People's Army forces in the Vietnam War. All four were reactivated and modernized at the direction of the United States Congress in 1981, and armed with missiles during the 1980s, as part of the 600-ship Navy initiative. During Operation Desert Storm in 1991, Missouri and Wisconsin fired missiles and  guns at Iraqi targets.

Costly to maintain, the battleships were decommissioned during the post-Cold War draw down in the early 1990s. All four were initially removed from the Naval Vessel Register, but the United States Congress compelled the Navy to reinstate two of them on the grounds that existing NGFS would be inadequate for amphibious operations. This resulted in a lengthy debate over whether battleships should have a role in the modern navy. Ultimately, all four ships were stricken from the Naval Vessel Register and released for donation to non-profit organizations.  With the transfer of Iowa in 2012, all four are part of non-profit maritime museums across the US.

Background
The vessels that eventually became the Iowa-class battleships were born from the US Navy's War Plan Orange, a Pacific war plan against Japan. War planners anticipated that the US fleet would engage and advance in the Central Pacific, with a long line of communication and logistics that would be vulnerable to high-speed Japanese cruisers. The chief concern was that the US Navy's traditional 21-knot battle line would be too slow to force these Japanese task forces into battle, while faster carriers and their cruiser escorts would be outmatched by the Japanese  battlecruisers, which had been upgraded in the 1930s to fast battleships. As a result, the US Navy envisioned a fast detachment of the battle line that could bring the Japanese fleet into battle. Even during the development process of the preceding  and  battleships, designs that could achieve over 30 knots in order to counter the threat of fast "big gun" ships were seriously considered. At the same time, a special strike force consisting of fast battleships operating alongside carriers and destroyers was being envisaged; such a force could operate independently in advance areas and act as scouts. This concept eventually evolved into the Fast Carrier Task Force, though initially the carriers were believed to be subordinate to the battleship.

Japan had refused to sign the treaty and in particular refused to accept the 14-inch gun caliber limit or the 5:5:3 ratio of warship tonnage limits for Britain, United States, and Japan respectively. This resulted in the three treaty powers, the United States, Britain, and France, invoking the escalator clause after April 1937.

Design

Early studies
One of the "slow" designs was an expanded South Dakota-class carrying either twelve 16-inch/45 caliber Mark 6 guns or nine /48 guns and with more armor and a power plant large enough to drive the larger ship through the water at the same 27-knot maximum speed as the South Dakotas. While the "fast" studies would result in the Iowa class, the "slow" design studies would eventually settle on twelve 16-inch guns and evolve into the design for the   after all treaty restrictions were removed following the start of World War II. Priority was given to the "fast" design in order to counter and defeat Japan's  Kongō-class battlecruisers, whose higher speed advantage over existing U.S. battleships might let them "penetrate U.S. cruisers, thereby making it 'open season' on U.S. supply ships", and then overwhelm the Japanese battle line was therefore a major driving force in setting the design criteria for the new ships, as was the restricting width of the Panama Canal.

For "fast" battleships, one such design, pursued by the Design Division section of the Bureau of Construction and Repair, was a "cruiser-killer". Their plan fulfilled these requirements with a ship of  standard displacement, but Chantry believed that more could be done if the ship were to be this large; with a displacement greater than that of most battleships, its armor would have protected it only against the  weapons carried by heavy cruisers.

Three improved plans – "A", "B", and "C" – were designed at the end of January. An increase in draft, vast additions to the armor, and the substitution of twelve  guns in the secondary battery was common among the three designs. "A" was the largest, at  standard, and was the only one to still carry the twelve 16-inch guns in four triple turrets (3-gun turrets according to US Navy). It required  to make . "B" was the smallest at  standard; like "A" it had a top speed of 32.5 knots, but "B" only required  to make this speed. It also carried only nine 16-inch guns, in three triple turrets.

Design history
In March 1938, the General Board followed the recommendations of the Battleship Design Advisory Board, which was composed of the naval architect William Francis Gibbs, William Hovgaard (then president of New York Shipbuilding), John Metten, Joseph W. Powell, and the long-retired Admiral and former Chief of the Bureau of Ordnance Joseph Strauss. The board requested an entirely new design study, again focusing on increasing the size of the  South Dakota-class.

These designs were able to convince the General Board that a reasonably well-designed and balanced 33-knot "fast" battleship was possible within the terms of the "escalator clause". However, further studies revealed major problems with the estimates. The speed of the ships meant that more freeboard would be needed both fore and amidships, the latter requiring an additional foot of armored freeboard. Along with this came the associated weight in supporting these new strains: the structure of the ship had to be reinforced and the power plant enlarged to avoid a drop in speed. In all, about  had to be added, and the large margin the navy designers had previously thought they had – roughly  – was suddenly vanishing. The draft of the ships was also allowed to increase, which enabled the beam to narrow and thus reduced required power (since lower beam-to-draft ratio reduces wave-making resistance). This also allowed the ships to be shortened which reduced weight.

Rather than retaining the 16-inch/45 caliber Mark 6 guns used in the South Dakotas, they ordered that the preliminary design would have to include the more powerful but significantly heavier 16-inch/50 caliber Mark 2 guns left over from the canceled s and  battleships of the early 1920s.

This put the ship at a total of  – well over the  limit. An apparent savior appeared in a Bureau of Ordnance preliminary design for a turret that could carry the 50-caliber guns while also fit in the smaller barbette of the 45-caliber gun turret. Other weight savings were achieved through thinning some armor elements and substituting construction steel with armor-grade Special Treatment Steel (STS) in certain areas. The net savings reduced the preliminary design displacement to  standard, though the margin remained tight. This breakthrough was shown to the General Board as part of a series of designs on 2 June 1938.

However, the Bureau of Ordnance continued working on the turret with the larger barbette, while the Bureau of Construction and Repair used the smaller barbettes in the contract design of the new battleships. As the bureaus were independent of one another, they did not realize that the two plans could not go together until November 1938, when the contract design was in the final stages of refinement. By this time, the ships could not use the larger barbette, as it would require extensive alterations to the design and would result in substantial weight penalties. Reverting to the 45-caliber gun was also deemed unacceptable. The General Board was astounded; one member asked the head of the Bureau of Ordnance if it had occurred to him that Construction and Repair would have wanted to know what turret his subordinates were working on "as a matter of common sense". A complete scrapping of plans was avoided only when designers within the Bureau of Ordnance were able to design a new 50-caliber gun, the Mark 7, that was both lighter and smaller in outside diameter; this allowed it to be placed in a turret that would fit in the smaller barbette. The contract design displacement subsequently stood at  standard and  full load.

In May 1938, the United States Congress passed the Second Vinson Act which "mandated a 20% increase in strength of the United States Navy". The act was sponsored by Carl Vinson, a Democratic Congressman from Georgia who was Chairman of the House Naval Affairs and Armed Services Committee. The Second Vinson Act updated the provisions of the Vinson-Trammell Act of 1934 and the Naval Act of 1936, which had "authorized the construction of the first American battleships in 17 years", based on the provisions of the London Naval Treaty of 1930; this act was quickly signed by President Franklin D. Roosevelt and provided the funding to build the Iowa class. Each ship cost approximately US$100 million.

As 1938 drew to a close the contract design of the Iowas was nearly complete, but it would continuously evolve as the New York Navy Yard, the lead shipyard, conducted the final detail design. These revisions included changing the design of the foremast, replacing the original /75-caliber guns that were to be used for anti-aircraft (AA) work with /70 caliber Oerlikon cannons and /56 caliber Bofors guns, and moving the combat information center into the armored hull. Additionally, in November 1939, the New York Navy Yard greatly modified the internal subdivision of the machinery rooms, as tests had shown the underwater protection in these rooms to be inadequate. The longitudinal subdivision of these rooms was doubled, and the result of this was clearly beneficial: "The prospective effect of flooding was roughly halved and the number of uptakes and hence of openings in the third deck greatly reduced." The design displacement was  standard, approximately 2% overweight, when Iowa and New Jersey were laid down in June and September 1940.

Specifications

General characteristics 

Like the two previous classes of American fast battleships, the Iowas feature a triple bottom under the armored citadel and armored skegs around the inboard shafts. The dimensions of the Iowas were strongly influenced by speed. The Navy also called for the class to have a lengthened forecastle and amidship, which would increase speed, and a bulbous bow.

The Iowas exhibit good stability, making them steady gun platforms. They also have excellent maneuverability in the open water for their size, while seakeeping is described as good, but not outstanding. In particular, the long fine bow and sudden widening of the hull just in front of the foremost turret contributed to the ships being rather wet for their size. This hull form also resulted in very intense spray formations, which led to some difficulty refueling escorting destroyers.

Armament

Main battery

The primary guns used on these battleships are the nine /50-caliber Mark 7 naval guns, a compromise design developed to fit inside the barbettes. The guns are housed in three 3-gun turrets: two forward of the battleship's superstructure and one aft, in a configuration known as "2-A-1". About  protrudes from the gun house. At maximum range, the projectile spends almost  minutes in flight. The maximum firing rate for each gun is two rounds per minute.

Each gun rests within an armored turret, but only the top of the turret protrudes above the main deck. The turret extends either four decks (Turrets 1 and 3) or five decks (Turret 2) down. The lower spaces contain rooms for handling the projectiles and storing the powder bags used to fire them. Each turret required a crew of between 85 and 110 men to operate. The original cost for each turret was US$1.4 million, but this figure does not take into account the cost of the guns themselves. The turrets are "three-gun", not "triple", because each barrel is individually sleeved and can be elevated and fired independently. The ship could fire any combination of its guns, including a broadside of all nine. The fire control was performed by the Mark 38 Gun Fire Control System (GFCS); the firing solutions were computed with the Mark 8 rangekeeper, an analogue computer that automatically receives information from the director and Mark 8/13 fire control radar, stable vertical, ship pitometer log and gyrocompass, and anemometer. The GFCS uses remote power control (RPC) for automatic gun laying.

The large-caliber guns were designed to fire two different conventional 16-inch shells: the  Mk. 8 "Super-heavy" APC (Armor Piercing, Capped) shell for anti-ship and anti-structure work, and the  Mk. 13 high-explosive round designed for use against unarmored targets and shore bombardment. When firing the same conventional shell, the 16-inch/45 caliber Mark 6 used by the fast battleships of the North Carolina and South Dakota classes had a slight advantage over the 16-inch/50 caliber Mark 7 gun when hitting deck armor – a shell from a 45 cal gun would be slower, meaning that it would have a steeper trajectory as it descended. At , a shell from a 45 cal would strike a ship at an angle of 45.2 degrees, as opposed to 36 degrees with the 50 cal. The Mark 7 had a greater maximum range over the Mark 6:  vs .

In the 1950s, the W23, an adaptation of the W19 nuclear artillery shell was developed specifically for the 16-inch guns. Although developed for exclusive use by the battleship's guns it is not known if any of the Iowas actually carried these shells while in active service due to the United States Navy's policy of refusing to confirm or deny the presence of nuclear weaponry aboard its ships. In 1991 the United States unilaterally withdrew all of its nuclear artillery shells from service, and dismantling of the US nuclear artillery inventory is said to have been completed in 2004.

Secondary battery

The Iowas carried twenty /38 caliber Mark 12 guns in ten Mark 28 Mod 2 enclosed base ring mounts. Originally designed to be mounted upon destroyers built in the 1930s, these guns were so successful that they were added to many American ships during the Second World War, including every major ship type and many smaller warships constructed between 1934 and 1945. They were considered to be "highly reliable, robust and accurate" by the Navy's Bureau of Ordnance.

Minimum and maximum elevations were −15 and 85 degrees respectively. The guns' elevation could be raised or lowered at about 15 degrees per second. The mounts closest to the bow and stern could aim from −150 to 150 degrees; the others were restricted to −80 to 80 degrees. They could be turned at about 25 degrees per second. The mounts were directed by four Mark 37 fire control systems primarily through remote power control (RPC).

The 5-inch/38 gun functioned as a dual purpose gun (DP); that is, it was able to fire at both surface and air targets with a reasonable degree of success. However, this did not mean that it possessed inferior anti-air abilities. As Japanese airplanes became faster, the gun lost some of its effectiveness in the anti-aircraft role; however, toward the end of the war its usefulness as an anti-aircraft weapon increased again because of an upgrade to the Mark 37 Fire Control System, Mark 1A computer, and proximity-fused shells.

The 5-inch/38 gun would remain on the battleships for the ships' entire service life; however, the total number of guns and gun mounts was reduced from twenty guns in ten mounts to twelve guns in six mounts during the 1980s' modernization of the four Iowas. The removal of four of the gun mounts was required for the battleships to be outfitted with the armored box launchers needed to carry and fire Tomahawk missiles. At the time of the 1991 Persian Gulf War, these guns had been largely relegated to littoral defense for the battleships. Since each battleship carried a small detachment of Marines aboard, the Marines would man one of the 5-inch gun mounts.

Anti-air battery

At the time of their commissioning, all four of the Iowa-class battleships were equipped with 20 quad 40 mm mounts and 49 single 20 mm mounts. These guns were respectively augmented with the Mk 14 range sight and Mk 51 fire control system to improve accuracy.

The Oerlikon  gun, one of the most heavily produced anti-aircraft guns of the Second World War, entered service in 1941 and replaced the  M2 Browning MG on a one-for-one basis. Between December 1941 and September 1944, 32% of all Japanese aircraft downed were credited to this weapon, with the high point being 48.3% for the second half of 1942; however, the 20 mm guns were found to be ineffective against the Japanese Kamikaze attacks used during the latter half of World War II and were subsequently phased out in favor of the heavier Bofors  AA gun.

When the Iowa-class battleships were commissioned in 1943 and 1944, they carried twenty quad 40 mm AA gun mounts, which they used for defense against enemy aircraft. These heavy AA guns were also employed in the protection of allied aircraft carriers operating in the Pacific Theater of World War II, and accounted for roughly half of all Japanese aircraft shot down between 1 October 1944 and 1 February 1945. Although successful in this role against WWII aircraft, the 40 mm guns were stripped from the battleships in the jet age – initially from New Jersey when reactivated in 1968 and later from Iowa, Missouri, and Wisconsin when they were reactivated for service in the 1980s.

Propulsion 

The powerplant of the Iowas consists of eight Babcock & Wilcox boilers and four sets of double reduction cross-compound geared turbines, with each turbine set driving a single shaft. Specifically, the geared turbines on Iowa and Missouri were provided by General Electric, while the equivalent machinery on New Jersey and Wisconsin was provided by Westinghouse.

The machinery spaces were longitudinally divided into eight compartments with alternating fire and engine rooms to ensure adequate isolation of machinery components. The double-expansion engines consist of a high-pressure (HP) turbine and a low-pressure (LP) turbine. The steam is first passed through the HP turbine which turns at up to 2,100 rpm. The steam, largely depleted at this point, is then passed through a large conduit to the LP turbine. The LP turbine increases efficiency and power by extracting the last little bit of energy from the steam. After leaving the LP turbine, the exhaust steam passes into a condenser and is then returned as feed water to the boilers. Water lost in the process is replaced by three evaporators, which can make a total of 60,000 US gallons per day (3 liters per second) of fresh water. After the boilers have had their fill, the remaining fresh water is fed to the ship's potable water systems for drinking, showers, hand washing, cooking, etc. All of the urinals and all but one of the toilets on the Iowa class flush with saltwater in order to conserve fresh water. The turbines, especially the HP turbine, can turn at 2,000 rpm; their shafts drive through reduction gearing that turns the propeller shafts at speeds up to 225 rpm, depending upon the desired speed of the ship. The Iowas were outfitted with four screws: the outboard pair consisting of four-bladed propellers  in diameter and inboard pair consisting of five-bladed propellers  in diameter. The two inner shafts were housed in skegs to smooth the flow of water to the propellers and improve the structural strength of the stern.

Each of the four engine rooms has a pair of 1,250 kW Ship's Service Turbine Generators (SSTGs), providing the ship with a total non-emergency electrical power of 10,000 kW at 450 volts alternating current. Additionally, the vessels have a pair of 250 kW emergency diesel generators. To allow battle-damaged electrical circuits to be repaired or bypassed, the lower decks of the ship have a Casualty Power System whose large 3-wire cables and wall outlets called "biscuits" can be used to reroute power.

Electronics (1943–69)
The earliest search radars installed were the SK air-search radar and SG surface-search radar during World War II. They were located on the mainmast and forward fire-control tower of the battleships, respectively. As the war drew to a close, the United States introduced the SK-2 air-search radar and SG surface-search radar; the Iowa class was updated to make use of these systems between 1945 and 1952. At the same time, the ships' radar systems were augmented with the installation of the SP height finder on the main mast. In 1952, AN/SPS-10 surface-search radar and AN/SPS-6 air-search radar replaced the SK and SG radar systems, respectively. Two years later the SP height finder was replaced by the AN/SPS-8 height finder, which was installed on the main mast of the battleships.

In addition to these search and navigational radars, the Iowa class were also outfitted with a variety of fire control radars for their gun systems. Beginning with their commissioning, the battleships made use of a pair Mk 38 gun fire control systems with Mark 8 fire control radar to direct the 16-inch guns and a quartet of Mk 37 gun fire control systems with Mark 12 fire control radar and Mark 22 height finding radar to direct the 5-inch gun batteries. These systems were upgraded over time with the Mark 13 replacing the Mark 8 and the Mark 25 replacing the Mark 12/22, but remained the cornerstones of the combat radar systems on the Iowa class during their careers.

In World War II, the electronic countermeasures (ECM) included the SPT-1 and SPT-4 equipment; passive electronic support measures (ESM) were a pair of DBM radar direction finders and three intercept receiving antennas, while the active components were the TDY-1 jammers located on the sides of the fire control tower. The ships were also equipped with the Mark III identification, friend or foe (IFF) system, which were replaced by the Mark X when the ships were overhauled in 1955. When the New Jersey was reactivated in 1968 for the Vietnam War, she was outfitted with the ULQ-6 ECM system.

Armor 

Like all battleships, the Iowas carried heavy armor protection against shellfire and bombs with significant underwater protection against torpedoes. The protection system consists of Class A face-hardened Krupp cemented (K.C.) armor and Class B homogeneous Krupp-type armor; furthermore, special treatment steel (STS), a high-tensile structural steel with armor properties comparable to Class B, was extensively used in the hull plating to increase protection.

The ends of the armored citadel are closed by  vertical Class A transverse bulkheads for Iowa and New Jersey. The deck armor consists of a  STS weather deck, a combined  Class B and STS main armor deck, and a  STS splinter deck. Over the magazines, the splinter deck is replaced by a  STS third deck that separates the magazine from the main armored deck. The powder magazine rooms are separated from the turret platforms by a pair of 1.5-inch STS annular bulkheads under the barbettes for flashback protection. The installation of armor on the Iowas also differed from those of earlier battleships in that the armor was installed while the ships were still "on the way" rather than after the ships had been launched.

The Iowas had heavily protected main battery turrets, with  Class B and STS face,  Class A sides,  Class A rear, and  Class B roof. The turret barbettes' armor is Class A with  abeam and  facing the centerline, extending down to the main armor deck. The propulsion shafts and steering gear compartment behind the citadel had considerable protection, with  Class A side strake and  roof.

The armor's immunity zone shrank considerably against guns equivalent to their own 16-inch/50-caliber guns armed with the Mk. 8 armor-piercing shell due to the weapon's increased muzzle velocity and improved shell penetration; increasing the armor would have increased weight and reduced speed, a compromise that the General Board was not willing to make.

The Iowas' torpedo defense was based on the South Dakotas' design, with modifications to address shortcomings discovered during caisson tests. The torpedo bulkheads were designed to elastically deform to absorb energy and the two outer compartments were liquid loaded in order to disrupt the gas bubble and slow fragments. The outer hull was intended to detonate a torpedo, with the outer two liquid compartments absorbing the shock and slowing any splinters or debris while the lower armored belt and the empty compartment behind it absorb any remaining energy. However, the Navy discovered in caisson tests in 1939 that the initial design for this torpedo defense system was actually less effective than the previous design used on the North Carolinas' due to the rigidity of the lower armor belt causing the explosion to significantly displace the final holding bulkhead inwards despite remaining watertight. To mitigate the effects, the third deck and triple bottom structure behind the lower armor belt were reinforced and the placement of brackets was changed. Iowas' system was also improved over the South Dakotas' through closer spacing of the transverse bulkheads, greater thickness of the lower belt at the triple bottom joint, and increased total volume of the "bulge". The system was further modified for the last two ships of the class, Illinois and Kentucky, by eliminating knuckles along certain bulkheads; this was estimated to improve the strength of the system by as much as 20%.

Based on costly lessons in the Pacific theater, concerns were raised about the ability of the armor on these battleships to withstand aerial bombing, particularly high altitude bombing using armor piercing bombs. Developments such as the Norden bombsight further fueled these concerns. While the design of the Iowas was too far along to adequately address this issue, experience in the Pacific theater eventually demonstrated that high altitude unguided bombing was ineffective against maneuvering warships.

Aircraft (1943–69) 
When they were commissioned during World War II, the Iowa-class battleships came equipped with two aircraft catapults designed to launch floatplanes. Initially, the Iowas carried the Vought OS2U Kingfisher and Curtiss SC Seahawk, both of which were employed to spot for the battleship's main gun batteries – and, in a secondary capacity, perform search-and-rescue missions.

By the time of the Korean War, helicopters had replaced floatplanes and the Sikorsky HO3S-1 helicopter was employed. New Jersey made use of the Gyrodyne QH-50 DASH drone for her Vietnam war deployment in 1968–69.

Conversion proposals 

The Iowa class were the only battleships with the speed required for post-war operations based around fast aircraft carrier task forces. There were a number of proposals in the early Cold War to convert the class to take into account changes in technology and doctrine. These included plans to equip the class with nuclear missiles, add aircraft capability and – in the case of Illinois and Kentucky – a proposal to rebuild both as aircraft carriers instead of battleships.

Initially, the Iowa class was to consist of only four battleships with hull numbers BB-61 to BB-64: Iowa, New Jersey, Missouri, and Wisconsin. However, changing priorities during World War II resulted in the battleship hull numbers BB-65  and BB-66  being reordered as Illinois and Kentucky respectively; Montana and Ohio were reassigned to hull numbers BB-67 and BB-68. At the time these two battleships were to be built a proposal was put forth to have them constructed as aircraft carriers rather than fast battleships. The plan called for the ships to be rebuilt to include a flight deck and an armament suite similar to that placed aboard the s that were at the time under construction in the United States. Ultimately, nothing came of the design proposal to rebuild these two ships as aircraft carriers and they were cleared for construction as fast battleships to conform to the Iowa-class design, though they differed from the earlier four that were built. Eventually, the  light cruisers were selected for the aircraft-carrier conversion. Nine of these light cruisers would be rebuilt as  light aircraft carriers.

After the surrender of the Empire of Japan, construction on Illinois and Kentucky stopped. Illinois was eventually scrapped, but Kentuckys construction had advanced enough that several plans were proposed to complete Kentucky as a guided missile battleship (BBG) by removing the aft turret and installing a missile system. A similar conversion had already been performed on the battleship  (BB-41/AG-128) to test the RIM-2 Terrier missile after World War II. He also suggested Terrier or RIM-8 Talos launchers to supplement the AA guns and proposed nuclear (instead of conventional) shells for the 16-inch guns. This never materialized, and Kentucky was ultimately sold for scrap in 1958, although her bow was used to repair her sister Wisconsin after a collision on 6 May 1956, earning her the nickname WisKy.

In 1954, the Long Range Objectives Group of the United States Navy suggested converting the Iowa-class ships to BBGs. In 1958, the Bureau of Ships offered a proposal based on this idea. This replaced the 5- and 16-inch gun batteries with "two Talos twin missile systems, two RIM-24 Tartar twin missile systems, an RUR-5 ASROC antisubmarine missile launcher, and a Regulus II installation with four missiles", as well as flagship facilities, sonar, helicopters, and fire-control systems for the Talos and Tartar missiles. In addition to these upgrades,  of additional fuel oil was also suggested to serve in part as ballast for the battleships and for use in refueling destroyers and cruisers. Due to the estimated cost of the overhaul ($178–193 million) this proposal was rejected as too expensive; instead, the SCB suggested a design with one Talos, one Tartar, one ASROC and two Regulus launchers and changes to the superstructure, at a cost of up to $85 million. This design was later revised to accommodate the Polaris Fleet Ballistic Missile, which in turn resulted in a study of two schemes by the SCB. In the end, none of these proposed conversions for the battleships were ever authorized. Interest in converting the Iowas into guided-missile battleships began to deteriorate in 1960, because the hulls were considered too old and the conversion costs too high. Nonetheless, additional conversion proposals – including one to install the AN/SPY-1 Aegis Combat System radar on the battleships – were suggested in 1962, 1974 and 1977, but as before, these proposals failed to gain the needed authorization. This was due, in part, to the possibility that sensitive electronics within  of any 16-inch gun muzzle may be damaged from overpressure.

1980s refit 
In 1980, Ronald Reagan was elected president on a promise to build up the U.S. military as a response to the increasing military power of the Soviet Union. The Soviet Navy was commissioning the Kirov class of missile cruisers, the largest type of surface warship built since World War II (other than aircraft carriers or amphibious assault vessels). As part of Reagan's 600-ship Navy policy and as a counter to the Kirov class, the U.S. Navy began reactivating the four Iowa-class units and modernizing them for service.

The Navy considered several proposals that would have removed the aft 16-inch turret. Martin Marietta proposed to replace the turret with servicing facilities for 12 AV-8B Harrier STOVL jumpjets. Charles Myers, a former Navy test pilot turned Pentagon consultant, proposed replacing the turret with vertical launch systems for missiles and a flight deck for Marine helicopters. An article
 in the U.S. Naval Institute's Proceedings proposed a canted flight deck with steam catapult and arrestor wires for F/A-18 Hornet fighters. Plans for these conversions were dropped in 1984.

Each battleship was overhauled to burn navy distillate fuel and modernized to carry electronic warfare suites, close-in weapon systems (CIWS) for self-defense, and missiles. The obsolete electronics and anti-aircraft armament were removed to make room for more modern systems. The Navy spent about $1.7 billion, from 1981 through 1988, to modernize and reactivate the four Iowa-class battleships, roughly the same as building four Oliver Hazard Perry-class frigates.

Armament 

During their modernization in the 1980s each Iowa was equipped with four of the US Navy's Phalanx CIWS mounts, two of which sat just behind the bridge and two which were next to the after ship's funnel. Iowa, New Jersey, and Missouri were equipped with the Block 0 version of the Phalanx, while Wisconsin received the first operational Block 1 version in 1988.

As part of their modernization in the 1980s, each of the Iowas received a complement of quad cell Armored Box Launchers and "shock hardened" Mk. 141 quad cell launchers. The former was used by the battleships to carry and fire the BGM-109 Tomahawk Land Attack Missiles (TLAMs) for use against enemy targets on land, while the latter system enabled the ships to carry a complement of RGM-84 Harpoon anti-ship missiles for use against enemy ships. It has been alleged by members of the environmental group Greenpeace that the battleships carried the TLAM-A (also cited, incorrectly, as the TLAM-N) – a Tomahawk missile with a variable yield W80 nuclear warhead – during their 1980s service with the United States Navy, but owing to the United States Navy's policy of refusing to confirm or deny the presence of nuclear weaponry aboard its ships, these claims can not be conclusively proved. Between 2010 and 2013, the U.S. withdrew the BGM-109A, leaving only conventional munitions packages for its Tomahawk missile inventory, though the Iowas had been withdrawn from service at that point.

Owing to the original 1938 design of the battleships, the Tomahawk missiles could not be fitted to the Iowa class unless the battleships were rebuilt in such a way as to accommodate the missile mounts that would be needed to store and launch the Tomahawks. This realization prompted the removal of the anti-aircraft guns previously installed on the Iowas and the removal of four of each of the battleships' ten 5-inch/38 DP mounts. The mid and aft end of the battleships were then rebuilt to accommodate the missile launchers. At one point, the NATO Sea Sparrow was to be installed on the reactivated battleships; however, it was determined that the system could not withstand the overpressure effects from firing the main battery. To supplement the anti-aircraft capabilities of the Iowas, five FIM-92 Stinger surface-to-air missile firing positions were installed. These secured the shoulder-launched weapons and their rounds for ready use by the crew.

Electronics 

During their modernization under the 600-ship Navy program, the Iowa-class battleships' radar systems were again upgraded. The AN/SPS-6 air-search radar system was replaced with the AN/SPS-49 radar set (which also augmented the existing navigation capabilities on the battleships), and the AN/SPS-8 surface-search radar set was replaced by the AN/SPS-67 search radar.

By the Korean War, jet engines had replaced propellers on aircraft, which severely limited the ability of the 20 mm and 40 mm AA batteries and their gun systems to track and shoot down enemy planes. Consequently, the AA guns and their associated fire-control systems were removed when reactivated. New Jersey received this treatment in 1967, and the others followed in their 1980s modernizations. In the 1980s, each ship also received a quartet of Phalanx CIWS mounts which made use of a radar system to locate incoming enemy projectiles and destroy them with a 20 mm Gatling gun before they could strike the ship.

With the added missile capacity of the battleships in the 1980s came additional fire-support systems to launch and guide the ordnance. To fire the Harpoon anti-ship missiles, the battleships were equipped with the SWG-1 fire-control system, and to fire the Tomahawk missiles the battleships used either the SWG-2 or SWG-3 fire-control system. In addition to these offensive-weapon systems, the battleships were outfitted with the AN/SLQ-25 Nixie to be used as a lure against enemy torpedoes, an SLQ-32 electronic warfare system that can detect, jam, and deceive an opponent's radar and a Mark 36 SRBOC system to fire chaff rockets intended to confuse enemy missiles.

Aside from the electronics added for weaponry control, all four battleships were outfitted with a communications suite used by both cruisers and guided missile cruisers in service at the time. This communication suite included the OE-82 antenna for satellite communications, but did not include the Naval Tactical Data System.

Aircraft (1982–1992) 

During the 1980s these battleships made use of the RQ-2 Pioneer, an unmanned aerial vehicle employed in spotting for the guns. Launched from the fantail using a rocket-assist booster that was discarded shortly after takeoff, the Pioneer carried a video camera in a pod under the belly of the aircraft which transmitted live video to the ship so operators could observe enemy actions or fall of shot during naval gunnery. To land the UAV a large net was deployed at the back of the ship; the aircraft was flown into it. Missouri and Wisconsin both used the Pioneer UAVs successfully during Operation Desert Storm, and in one particularly memorable incident, a Pioneer UAV operated by Wisconsin received the surrender of Iraqi troops during combat operations. This particular Pioneer was later donated to the Smithsonian Institution, and is now on public display. During Operation Desert Storm these Pioneers were operated by detachments of VC-6. In addition to the Pioneer UAVs, the recommissioned Iowas could support six types of helicopters: the Sikorsky HO3S-1, UH-1 Iroquois, SH-2 Seasprites, CH-46 Sea Knight, CH-53 Sea Stallion and the LAMPS III SH-60B Seahawk.

Gunfire support role 

Following the 1991 Gulf War and the subsequent dissolution of the Soviet Union, the United States Navy began to decommission and mothball many of the ships it had brought out of its reserve fleet in the drive to attain a 600-ship Navy. At the height of Navy Secretary John F. Lehman's 600-ship Navy plan, nearly 600 ships of all types were active within the Navy. This included fifteen aircraft carriers, four battleships and over 100 submarines, along with various other types of ships the overall plan specified. When the Soviet Union collapsed in 1991 the Navy sought to return to its traditional, 313-ship composition. While reducing the fleet created under the 600-ship Navy program, the decision was made to deactivate the four recommissioned Iowa-class battleships and return them to the reserve fleet.

In 1995, the decommissioned battleships were removed from the Naval Vessel Register after it was determined by ranking US Navy officials that there was no place for a battleship in the modern navy. In response to the striking of the battleships from the Naval Vessel Register a movement began to reinstate the battleships, on the grounds that these vessels had superior firepower over the 5-inch guns found on the Spruance, Kidd and Arleigh Burke-class destroyers and Ticonderoga-class cruisers. Citing concern over the lack of available gunfire to support amphibious operations, Congress required the Navy to reinstate two battleships to the Naval Vessel Register and maintain them with the mothball fleet, until the Navy could certify it had gunfire support within the current fleet that would meet or exceed the battleship's capability.

Cost overruns caused the class to be reduced to three ships. These ships are outfitted with an Advanced Gun System (AGS) that was to fire specially developed 6-inch Long Range Land Attack Projectiles for shore bombardment;. LRLAP procurement was cancelled in 2017 and the AGS is unusable. The long-term goal for the Zumwalt class is to have the ships mount railguns or free-electron lasers.

Cultural significance 

The Iowa class became culturally symbolic in the United States in many different ways, to the point where certain elements of the American public – such as the United States Naval Fire Support Association – were unwilling to part with the battleships, despite their apparent obsolescence in the face of modern naval combat doctrine that places great emphasis on air supremacy and missile firepower. Although all were officially stricken from the Naval Vessel Register they were spared scrapping and were donated for use as museum ships.

Their service records added to their fame, ranging from their work as carrier escorts in World War II to their shore bombardment duties in North Korea, North Vietnam, and the Middle East, as well as their service in the Cold War against the expanded Soviet Navy. Their reputation combined with the stories told concerning the firepower of these battleships' 16-inch guns were such that when they were brought out of retirement in the 1980s in response to increased Soviet Naval activity – and in particular, in response to the commissioning of the Kirov-class battlecruisers – the United States Navy was inundated with requests from former sailors pleading for a recall to active duty so they could serve aboard one of the battleships.

In part because of the service length and record of the class, members have made numerous appearances in television shows, video games, movies, and other media, including appearances of the Kentucky and Illinois in the anime series Neon Genesis Evangelion, the History Channel documentary series Battle 360: USS Enterprise, the Discovery Channel documentary The Top 10 Fighting Ships (where the Iowa class was rated Number 1), the book turned movie A Glimpse of Hell, the 1989 music video for the song by Cher "If I Could Turn Back Time", the 1992 film Under Siege, the 2012 film Battleship, among other appearances. Japanese rock band Vamps performed the finale of their 2009 US tour on board Missouri on 19 September 2009.

Ships in class

When brought into service during the final years of World War II, the Iowa-class battleships were assigned to operate in the Pacific Theatre of World War II. By this point in the war, aircraft carriers had displaced battleships as the primary striking arm of both the United States Navy and the Imperial Japanese Navy. As a result of this shift in tactics, U.S. fast battleships of all classes were relegated to the secondary role of carrier escorts and assigned to the Fast Carrier Task Force to provide anti-aircraft screening for U.S. aircraft carriers and perform shore bombardment. Three were recalled to service in the 1950s with the outbreak of the Korean War, and provided naval artillery support for U.N. forces for the entire duration of the war before being returned to mothballs in 1955 after hostilities ceased. In 1968, to help alleviate U.S. air losses over North Vietnam, New Jersey was summoned to Vietnam, but was decommissioned a year after arriving. All four returned in the 1980s during the drive for a 600-ship Navy to counter the new Soviet Kirov-class battlecruisers, only to be retired after the collapse of the Soviet Union on the grounds that they were too expensive to maintain.

Iowa 

Iowa was ordered 1 July 1939, laid down 27 June 1940, launched 27 August 1942, and commissioned 22 February 1943. She conducted a shakedown cruise in Chesapeake Bay before sailing to Naval Station Argentia, Newfoundland, to be ready in case the  entered the Atlantic. Transferred to the Pacific Fleet in 1944, Iowa made her combat debut in February and participated in the campaign for the Marshall Islands. The ship later escorted U.S. aircraft carriers conducting air raids in the Marianas campaign, and then was present at the Battle of Leyte Gulf. During the Korean War, Iowa bombarded enemy targets at Songjin, Hŭngnam and Kojo, North Korea. Iowa returned to the US for operational and training exercises before being decommissioned on 24 February 1958. Reactivated in the early 1980s, Iowa operated in the Atlantic Fleet, cruising in North American and European waters for most of the decade and participating in joint military exercises with European ships. On 19 April 1989, 47 sailors were killed following an explosion in her No. 2 turret. In 1990, Iowa was decommissioned for the last time and placed in the mothball fleet. She was stricken from the Naval Vessel Register on 17 March 2006. Iowa was anchored as part of the National Defense Reserve Fleet in Suisun Bay, California until October 2011, when she was towed from her mooring to Richmond, California for renovation as a museum ship. She was towed from Richmond in the San Francisco Bay on 26 May 2012, to San Pedro at the Los Angeles Waterfront to serve as a museum ship run by Pacific Battleship Center and opened to the public on 7 July 2012.

New Jersey 

New Jersey was ordered 4 July 1939, laid down 16 September 1940, launched 7 December 1942, and commissioned 23 May 1943. New Jersey completed fitting out and trained her initial crew in the Western Atlantic and Caribbean before transferring to the Pacific Theatre in advance of the planned assault on the Marshall Islands, where she screened the U.S. fleet of aircraft carriers from enemy air raids. At the Battle of Leyte Gulf, the ship protected carriers with her anti-aircraft guns. New Jersey then bombarded Iwo Jima and Okinawa. During the Korean War, the ship pounded targets at Wonsan, Yangyang, and Kansong. Following the Armistice, New Jersey conducted training and operation cruises until she was decommissioned on 21 August 1957. Recalled to duty in 1968, New Jersey reported to the gunline off the Vietnamese coast, and shelled North Vietnamese targets before departing the line in December 1968. She was decommissioned the following year. Reactivated in 1982 under the 600-ship Navy program, New Jersey was sent to Lebanon to protect U.S. interests and U.S. Marines, firing her main guns at Druze and Syrian positions in the Beqaa Valley east of Beirut. Decommissioned for the last time 8 February 1991, New Jersey was briefly retained on the Naval Vessel Register before being donated to the Home Port Alliance of Camden, New Jersey for use as a museum ship in October 2001.

Missouri 

Missouri was the last of the four Iowas to be completed. She was ordered 12 June 1940, laid down 6 January 1941, launched 29 January 1944, and commissioned 11 June 1944. Missouri conducted her trials off New York with shakedown and battle practice in Chesapeake Bay before transferring to the Pacific Fleet, where she screened US aircraft carriers involved in offensive operations against the Japanese before reporting to Okinawa to shell the island in advance of the planned landings. Following the bombardment of Okinawa, Missouri turned her attention to the Japanese homeland islands of Honshu and Hokkaido, performing shore bombardment and screening US carriers involved in combat operations. She became a symbol of the US Navy's victory in the Pacific when representatives of the Empire of Japan boarded the battleship to sign the documents of unconditional surrender to the Allied powers in September 1945. After World War II, Missouri conducted largely uneventful training and operational cruises until suffering a grounding accident. In 1950, she was dispatched to Korea in response to the outbreak of the Korean War. Missouri served two tours of duty in Korea providing shore bombardment. She was decommissioned in 1956. She spent many years at Puget Sound Naval Shipyard in Bremerton, Washington. Reactivated in 1984, as part of the 600-ship Navy plan, Missouri was sent on operational cruises until being assigned to Operation Earnest Will in 1988. In 1991, Missouri participated in Operation Desert Storm, firing 28 Tomahawk Missiles and 759 16-inch shells at Iraqi targets along the coast. Decommissioned for the last time in 1992, Missouri was donated to the USS Missouri Memorial Association of Pearl Harbor, Hawaii, for use as a museum ship in 1999.

Wisconsin 

Wisconsin was ordered 12 June 1940, laid down 25 January 1942, launched 7 December 1943, and commissioned 16 April 1944. After trials and initial training in Chesapeake Bay, she transferred to the Pacific Fleet in 1944, and was assigned to protect the US fleet of aircraft carriers involved in operations in the Philippines until summoned to Iwo Jima to bombard the island in advance of the Marine landings. Afterward, she proceeded to Okinawa, bombarding the island in advance of the allied amphibious assault. In mid-1945 Wisconsin turned her attention to bombarding the Japanese home islands until the surrender of Japan in August. Reactivated in 1950, for the Korean War, Wisconsin served two tours of duty, assisting South Korean and UN forces by providing call fire support and shelling targets. In 1956, the bow of the uncompleted Kentucky was removed and grafted on Wisconsin, which had collided with the destroyer . Decommissioned in 1958, Wisconsin was placed in the reserve fleet at the Philadelphia Naval Shipyard until reactivated in 1986, as part of the 600-ship Navy plan. In 1991, Wisconsin participated in Operation Desert Storm, firing 24 Tomahawk Missiles at Iraqi targets, and expending 319 16-inch shells at Iraqi troop formations along the coast. Decommissioned for the last time 30 September 1991, Wisconsin was placed in the reserve fleet until stricken from the Naval Vessel Register on 17 March 2006, so she could be transferred for use as a museum ship. Wisconsin is currently berthed at the Nauticus maritime museum in Norfolk, Virginia.

Illinois and Kentucky 

Hull numbers BB-65 and BB-66 were originally intended as the first and second ships of the Montana-class of battleships; however the passage of an emergency war building program on 19 July 1940 resulted in both hulls being reordered as Iowa-class units to save time on construction. The war ended before either could be completed, and work was eventually stopped. Initially, proposals were made to convert the hulls into aircraft carriers similar to the Essex-class, but the effort was dropped.

 was ordered on 9 September 1940, and initially laid down on 6 December 1942. However, work was suspended pending a decision on whether to convert the hull to an aircraft carrier. Upon determination the result would cost more and be less capable than building from scratch construction resumed, but was canceled for good approximately one-quarter complete on 11 August 1945. She was sold for scrap and broken up on the slipway in September 1958.

 was ordered on 9 September 1940 and laid down on 7 March 1942. Work on the ship was suspended in June 1942, and the hull floated out to make room for the construction of LSTs. The interruption lasted for two and a half years while a parallel aircraft carrier debate played out as with Illinois, reaching the same conclusion. Work resumed in December 1944, with completion projected for mid-1946. Further suggestions were made to convert Kentucky into a specialist anti-aircraft ship, and work was again suspended. With the hull approximately three-quarters completed she was floated on 20 January 1950, to clear a dry-dock for repairs to Missouri, which had run aground. During this period, plans were proposed to convert Kentucky into a guided missile battleship, which saw her reclassified from BB-66 to BBG-1. When these failed construction of any sort, work never resumed and the ship was used as a parts hulk; in 1956, her bow was removed and shipped in one piece across Hampton Roads and grafted onto Wisconsin, which had collided with the destroyer Eaton. Ultimately, what remained of the hulk was sold for scrap on 31 October 1958.

Notes

References

Sources

Further reading

External links 

 A comparison of seven battleship classes during WWII
 War Service Fuel Consumption of U.S. Naval Surface Vessels FTP 218
 Firing Procedure for the 16"/50 (40.6 cm) Mark 7
 Operating Instructions for Five Inch, 38 Caliber, Gun Crews

 
Battleship classes
Cold War battleships of the United States
Korean War battleships of the United States
Vietnam War battleships of the United States